Marzieh Sotoudeh (born 1957 in Tehran) is an Iranian Canadian writer and translator who won Hedayat's literary award in 2004 . She left her country during the early years of the war between Iran and Iraq and settled in Canada.

References 

Living people
1957 births
Iranian women writers
Iranian translators
Canadian women non-fiction writers
Canadian translators
Canadian people of Iranian descent
People from Tehran
Iranian women short story writers